The 2021–22 FIS Cross-Country World Cup was the 41st official World Cup season in cross-country skiing for men and women.

The season began on 26 November 2021 in Ruka, Finland and was scheduled to conclude with the World Cup Finals on 18–20 March 2022 in Tyumen, Russia. But after the Russian invasion of Ukraine FIS announced that the World Cup Finals would be cancelled or moved. As a result, the final competition was the mixed team events on 13 March 2022 in Falun, Sweden. The season featured a break in February for the 2022 Winter Olympics in Beijing.

On 1 March 2022, following the 2022 Russian invasion of Ukraine, FIS decided to exclude athletes from Russia and Belarus from FIS competitions, with an immediate effect.

Men

Calendar

Men's relay

Standings

Overall

Distance

Sprint

U23

Bonus Ranking

Prize money

Women

Calendar

Women's relay

Standings

Overall

Distance

Sprint

U23

Bonus Ranking

Prize money

Mixed team

Nations Cup

Overall

Men

Women

Points distribution 
The table shows the number of points to win in every competition in the 2021/22 Cross-Country Skiing World Cup for men and women. Team Sprint and Relay used to count only for Nations Cup but in this season they also made an impact on individual standings, unless it is mixed competition for men and women. Starting this season bonus points will be counted for sprint qualifications.

Achievements 

Only individual events.

First World Cup career victory 

Men
 Alexander Terentyev (22), in his 4th season – the WC 1 (Sprint C) in Ruka; also first podium
 Håvard Solås Taugbøl (28), in his 9th season – the WC 8 (Sprint F) in Dresden; first podium was 2019–20 WC 5 (Sprint F) in Davos
 Richard Jouve (27), in his 8th season – the WC 12 (Sprint C) in Drammen; first podium was 2014–15 WC 23 (Sprint F) in Lahti
 Martin Løwstrøm Nyenget (29), in his 9th season – the WC 13 (50 km Mass Start C) in Oslo; first podium was 2019–20 WC 14 (15 km Pursuit C) in Östersund

Women

First World Cup podium 

Men
 Alexander Terentyev (22), in his 4th season – the WC 1 (Sprint C) in Ruka – 1st place
 Thomas Helland Larsen (23), in his 3rd season – the WC 4 (Sprint F) in Lillehammer – 2nd place
 Wang Qiang (28), in his 4th season – the WC 12 (Sprint C) in Drammen – 2nd place
 Joni Mäki (27), in his 9th season – the WC 14 (Sprint C) in Falun – 2nd place
 Friedrich Moch (21), in his 3rd season – the WC 9 (10 km Mass Start F) in Val di Fiemme – 3rd place
 William Poromaa (21), in his 4th season – the WC 11 (15 km C) in Lahti – 3rd place
 Harald Østberg Amundsen (23), in his 4th season – the WC 15 (15 km F) in Falun – 3rd place

Women
 Mathilde Myhrvold (23), in her 4th season – the WC 9 (Sprint F) in Lenzerheide – 2nd place
 Tiril Udnes Weng (25), in her 8th season – the WC 4 (Sprint F) in Lillehammer – 3rd place
 Johanna Matintalo (25), in her 7th season – the WC 9 (Sprint C) in Oberstdorf – 3rd place

Number of wins this season (in brackets are all-time wins) 

Men
 Johannes Høsflot Klæbo – 8 (48)
 Iivo Niskanen – 3 (8)
 Simen Hegstad Krüger – 2 (6)
 Richard Jouve – 2 (2)
 Alexander Bolshunov – 1 (28)
 Sjur Røthe – 1 (6)
 Didrik Tønseth – 1 (4)
 Alexander Terentyev – 1 (1)
 Håvard Solås Taugbøl – 1 (1)
 Martin Løwstrøm Nyenget – 1 (1)

Women
 Therese Johaug – 5 (82) 
 Maja Dahlqvist – 4 (5)
 Natalya Nepryayeva – 3 (6)
 Jessie Diggins – 2 (12)
 Jonna Sundling – 2 (5)
 Frida Karlsson – 2 (3)
 Maiken Caspersen Falla – 1 (22)
 Heidi Weng – 1 (13)
 Kerttu Niskanen – 1 (3)

Retirements

Men
 Adrien Backscheider
   Dario Cologna
 Jean-Marc Gaillard
 Baptiste Gros
   Jovian Hediger
 Ján Koristek
 Peter Mlynár
   Ueli Schnider

Women
 Elisa Brocard
 Cendrine Browne
 Maiken Caspersen Falla
 Antonia Fräbel
   Laurien van der Graaff
 Hannah Halvorsen
 Nadine Herrmann
 Petra Hynčicová
 Therese Johaug
 Charlotte Kalla
 Anamarija Lampič
 Katharine Ogden
 Caitlin Patterson
 Julia Preusseger
 Alena Procházková
 Riitta-Liisa Roponen
 Lucia Scardoni
 Evelina Settlin
 Anne Winkler

Notes

References 

 
FIS Cross-Country World Cup seasons
World Cup
World Cup